The Stow Creek School District is a community public school district that serves students in kindergarten through eighth grade from Stow Creek Township, in Cumberland County, New Jersey, United States.

Under the Greenwich - Stow Creek Partnership established in 2009 with the Greenwich Township School District in Greenwich Township, students from both townships attend Morris Goodwin School for grades K-4 and Stow Creek School for grades 5-8.

As of the 2020–21 school year, the district, comprised of one school, had an enrollment of 125 students and 25.4 classroom teachers (on an FTE basis), for a student–teacher ratio of 4.9:1. In the 2016-17 school year, it had the 13th-smallest enrollment of any school district in the state.

The district is classified by the New Jersey Department of Education as being in District Factor Group "CD", the third-lowest of eight groupings. District Factor Groups organize districts statewide to allow comparison by common socioeconomic characteristics of the local districts. From lowest socioeconomic status to highest, the categories are A, B, CD, DE, FG, GH, I and J.

Public school students in ninth through twelfth grades attend Cumberland Regional High School, which also serves students from Deerfield Township, Fairfield Township, Greenwich Township, Hopewell Township, Shiloh Borough, Stow Creek Township and Upper Deerfield Township. As of the 2020–21 school year, the high school had an enrollment of 1,032 students and 78.5 classroom teachers (on an FTE basis), for a student–teacher ratio of 13.1:1.

School
Stow Creek School had an enrollment of 124 students in grades PreK-8 in the 2020–21 school year.

Administration
Core members of the district's administration are:
Brandon Cobb, Superintendent
Kim Fleetwood, Business Administrator / Board Secretary

Board of education
The district's board of education is comprised of seven members who set policy and oversee the fiscal and educational operation of the district through its administration. As a Type II school district, the board's trustees are elected directly by voters to serve three-year terms of office on a staggered basis, with either two or three seats up for election each year held (since 2012) as part of the November general election. The board appoints a superintendent to oversee the district's day-to-day operations and a business administrator to supervise the business functions of the district.

References

External links
Greenwich Stow Creek Partnership Schools

School Data for the Stow Creek School, National Center for Education Statistics
Cumberland Regional High School

Stow Creek Township, New Jersey
New Jersey District Factor Group CD
School districts in Cumberland County, New Jersey